The 2018–19 Central Arkansas Sugar Bears basketball team will represent the University of Central Arkansas during the 2018–19 NCAA Division I women's basketball season. The Sugar Bears will be led by seventh year head coach Sandra Rushing and will play their home games at the Farris Center. They are members of the Southland Conference.

Previous season
The Sugar Bears finished the 2017–18 season 25–10, 14–4 in Southland play to finish in third place. They advanced to the semifinals of the Southland women's tournament where they lost to Stephen F. Austin. They received an invite to the WBI where they defeated SIU Ewardsville, Weber State and Nevada in the first round, quarterfinals and semifinals to advanced to the championship game where they lost to Yale in the championship game.

Roster
Sources:

Schedule
Sources:

|-
!colspan=9 style=| Non-conference regular Schedule

|-
!colspan=9 style=| Southland Conference Schedule

|-
!colspan=9 style=| Southland Women's Tournament

See also
2018–19 Central Arkansas Bears basketball team

References

Central Arkansas Sugar Bears basketball seasons
Central Arkansas
Central Arkansas Bears basketball team
Central Arkansas Bears basketball team